Kärla-Kulli is a village in Saaremaa Parish, Saare County in western Estonia on the island of Saaremaa.

Before the administrative reform in 2017, the village was in Lääne-Saare Parish (prior to 2014 part of Kärla Parish).

References

Villages in Saare County
Saaremaa Parish